Khalifa Ibrahim (Arabic:خليفة إبراهيم) (born 30 March 1991) is an Emirati footballer who plays .

External links

References

Emirati footballers
1991 births
Living people
Al Ahli Club (Dubai) players
Al Dhafra FC players
Dibba FC players
Al-Shaab CSC players
Khor Fakkan Sports Club players
Al Dhaid SC players
UAE First Division League players
UAE Pro League players
Association football midfielders